Austin Bat Cave (ABC) is a 501(c)3 nonprofit organization in Austin, Texas, United States, that provides children and teenagers, ages 6–18, with opportunities to develop their creative and expository writing skills. ABC connects a diverse population of young leaders with a community of adult volunteers by providing one-on-one tutoring. All that ABC does is free of charge.

Programs 
The Austin Bat Cave offers avenues for students to grow as writers. The in-school tutoring focuses on absorbing grammar and increasing fluency through creative writing; students in the ABC program generate and revise their own work as well as acting as their own editorial board to put together an anthology for each year.

At the evening and weekend writing workshops students get together with local artists, from local band Okkervil River to director Carlos Trevino to poet Jenny Brown and editor of the Texas Monthly, Jake Silverstein. During these sessions students learn about and work on an aspect of a writer's craft.

Each summer Austin Bat Cave offers 10-13 weeklong summer camps, many open registration and all free for the children.

Volunteers and supporters 
A network of over 300 volunteers from the arts, education, and activist communities of Austin support Austin Bat Cave’s mission statement.

Donor community 
Despite the organization’s youth and the hard economic times, ABC has a strong donor base, which stems from individuals, foundations, and businesses. These supporters include Burdine Johnson Foundation, Lewis Carnegie, Home Slice Pizza, many more, and hundreds of generous donors.

References

External links
Austin Bat Cave
826 National
AISD AVID program
Dalton Publishing

Organizations based in Austin, Texas